4 is the fourth studio album by Italian Eurodance project Whigfield which was performed by Danish-born Sannie Charlotte Carlson, released in May 2002.

The album was re-released in 2004 after the release of "Was a Time" in Germany and was called Was A Time - The Album. The album contains the single "Was a Time", as well as the tracks previously on 4. It also includes a bonus DVD which features music videos for some of the singles Whigfield has released. A DVD was also released with Was A Time - The Album as a bonus CD, the DVD is called Was A Time - The Essential Whigfield and features the same tracks and music videos as below.

4 track list
Gotta Getcha
Amazing & Beautiful
Beep Beep
Boys Boys Boys
Fantasy
Candy
I Knew Before
My Love's Gone
Get Get Get
Take Me To The Summertime
Outside Life
Welcome To Fun
My My
Every Single Day & Night
Tomorrow

Was A Time - the album track list
Was A Time
Amazing & Beautiful
Beep Beep
Boys Boys Boys
Fantasy
Candy
I Knew Before
My Love's Gone
Get Get Get
Take Me To The Summertime
Outside Life
Welcome To Fun
My My
Every Single Day & Night
Tomorrow
Gotta Getcha

DVD
Was A Time
Saturday Night
Think of You
Sexy Eyes
Big Time
Close To You
Gimme Gimme
Baby Boy
No Tears To Cry
Givin' All My Love
Be My Baby
Last Christmas
Another Day

References

External links

2002 albums
Whigfield albums